Vice Admiral Sir Hilary Worthington Biggs,  (15 January 1905 – 2 January 1976) was a senior Royal Navy officer.

Naval career
Hilary Worthington Biggs was born on 15 January 1905, the son of Lieutenant Colonel C. W. Biggs. After several promotions in the 1920s, Biggs became a lieutenant commander in 1934 and a commander four years later.

He was also awarded the War Cross, 3rd Class from Greece and Poland's Cross of Valour in 1942. Biggs then served in the Battle of Crete, before being posted to the Admiralty as Deputy Naval Assistant to the Second Sea Lord (1942–44). He was promoted to captain in 1943, and commanded  from 1944 (he was also Captain (D), 11th Destroyer Flotilla of the Eastern Fleet), serving in the Indian Ocean.

With the Second World War over, Biggs commanded  (1946–48) and served as Assistant Chief of Supplies at the Admiralty. He was Captain of the Fleet on the Home Fleet from 1950 to 1952, and the next year became rear admiral and Deputy Chief of Naval Personnel (Personal Services). In 1955, he became Flag Officer of the Home Fleet Training Squadron and then, from 1956 to 1958 was posted as the last Commander-in-Chief of the East Indies Station.

Biggs was appointed a Companion of the Order of the Bath in 1955 and, three years later, he was appointed Knight Commander of the Order of the British Empire. He died on 2 January 1976, leaving a widow (Florence, daughter of Sir Roger Backhouse) and four children. One of his sons was Vice Admiral Sir Geoffrey Biggs (1938–2002).

References

External links
 Sir Hilary Worthington Biggs, by Elliott & Fry (bromide print, 4 July 1956); National Portrait Gallery, London (Photographs Collection, NPG x86358).

1905 births
1976 deaths
Companions of the Distinguished Service Order
Companions of the Order of the Bath
Knights Commander of the Order of the British Empire
Recipients of the Cross of Valour (Poland)
Recipients of the War Cross (Greece)
Royal Navy vice admirals
Royal Navy personnel of World War II